The golden age of Jewish culture in Spain, which coincided with the Middle Ages in Europe, was a period of Muslim rule during which, intermittently, Jews were generally accepted in society and Jewish religious, cultural, and economic life flourished.

The nature and length of this "Golden Age" has been debated, as there were at least three periods during which non-Muslims were oppressed. A few scholars give the start of the Golden Age as 711–718, the Muslim conquest of Iberia. Others date it from 912, during the rule of Abd al-Rahman III. The end of the age is variously given as 1031, when the Caliphate of Córdoba ended; 1066, the date of the Granada massacre; 1090, when the Almoravids invaded; or the mid-12th century, when the Almohads invaded.

Historiography and nature of Golden Age

Having invaded southern Spain and coming to rule in a matter of seven years, Islamic rulers were confronted with many questions relating to the implementation of Islamic rule of a non-Islamic society. The coexistence of Muslims, Jews, and Christians during this time is revered by many writers. Al-Andalus was a key center of Jewish life during the early Middle Ages. As Sefarad, al-Andalus was the "capital" of world Judaism.

María Rosa Menocal, a specialist in Iberian literature at Yale University, claims  that "tolerance was an inherent aspect of Andalusian society". Menocal's 2003 book, The Ornament of the World, argues that the Jewish dhimmis living under the Caliphate were allowed fewer rights than Muslims but were still better off than in the Christian parts of Europe. Jews from other parts of Europe made their way to al-Andalus, where in parallel to Christian sects regarded as heretical by Catholic Europe, they were not just tolerated, but where opportunities to practise faith and trades were open without restriction save for the prohibitions on proselytisation and, sometimes, on synagogue construction.

Bernard Lewis takes issue with this view, calling it ahistorical and exaggerated. He argues that Islam traditionally did not offer equality or even pretend that it did and argues that it would have been both a "theological as well as a logical absurdity." However, he also states:

Mark R. Cohen, Professor of Near Eastern Studies at Princeton University, in his Under Crescent and Cross, calls the idealized interfaith utopia a "myth" that was first promulgated by Jewish historians such as Heinrich Graetz in the 19th century as a rebuke to Christian countries for their treatment of Jews. This myth was met with the "counter-myth" of the "neo-lachrymose conception of Jewish-Arab history" by Bat Ye'or and others, which also "cannot be maintained in the light of historical reality".

Birth of the Golden Age
Prior to 589, the Jewish population of Spain was tolerated by its Arian Visigoth rulers and placed on equal footing with the other ethnic and religious communities of the region. The Arians may have preferred the Jewish population to the Catholic one, as they did not fear political enmity from the Jews. The Visigoths were mainly indifferent towards Jews and allowed them to grow and prosper. After the Visigoths joined the Catholic Church, they placed ever greater economic burdens on the Jewish population, and later persecuted them severely. It is possible that Jews welcomed the Muslim Arab and mainly-Berber conquerors in the 8th century.

A period of tolerance dawned for the Jews of the Iberian Peninsula. Their number was considerably augmented by immigration from North Africa in the wake of the Muslim conquest. Immigrants from North Africa and the Middle East bolstered the Jewish population and made Muslim Spain probably the largest centre of contemporary Jews. Especially after 912, during the reign of Abd al-Rahman III and his son, Al-Hakam II, the Jews prospered culturally, and some notable figures held high posts in the Caliphate of Córdoba. Jewish philosophers, mathematicians, astronomers, poets and rabbinical scholars composed highly-rich cultural and scientific work. Many devoted themselves to the study of the sciences and philosophy, composing many of the most valuable texts of Jewish philosophy. Jews took part in the overall prosperity of Muslim Al-Andalus. Jewish economic expansion was unparallelled. In Toledo, after the Christian reconquest in 1085, Jews were involved in translating Arabic texts to the romance languages in the so-called Toledo School of Translators, as they had been previously in translating Greek and Hebrew texts to Arabic. Jews also contributed to botany, geography, medicine, mathematics, poetry and philosophy.

'Abd al-Rahman's court physician and minister was Hasdai ibn Shaprut, the patron of Menahem ben Saruq, Dunash ben Labrat and other Jewish scholars and poets. In following centuries, Jewish thought flourished under famous figures such as Samuel Ha-Nagid, Moses ibn Ezra, Solomon ibn Gabirol and Judah Halevi. During 'Abd al-Rahman's term of power, the scholar Moses ben Hanoch was appointed rabbi of Córdoba, and as a consequence al-Andalus became the center of Talmudic study, and Córdoba the meeting-place of Jewish savants.

It was a time of partial Jewish autonomy. As "dhimmis", "protected non-Muslims", Jews in the Islamic world paid the jizya, which was administered separately from the zakat paid by Muslims. The jizya has been viewed variously as a head tax, as payment for non-conscription in the military (as non-Muslims were normally prohibited from bearing arms or receiving martial training) or as a tribute. Jews had their own legal system and social services. monotheist religions of the People of the Book were tolerated but conspicuous displays of faith, such as bells and processions, were discouraged.

Comparing the treatment of Jews in the medieval Islamic world and medieval Christian Europe, the Jews were far more integrated in the political and economic life of Islamic society, and usually faced far less violence from Muslims, but there were some instances of persecution in the Islamic world as well from the 11th century. The Islamic world classified Jews and Christians as dhimmis and allowed Jews to practice their religion more freely than they could in Christian Europe.

Other authors criticize the modern notion of Al-Andalus being a tolerant society of equal opportunities for all religious groups as a "myth". Jews were living in an uneasy coexistence with Muslims and Catholics, and the relationship between the groups was more often than not marked by segregation and mutual hostility. In the 1066 Granada massacre of much of the Jewish population of the city, the Jewish death toll was higher than in the much-publicized Christian pogromes in the Rhineland slightly later. The notable Jewish philosopher Moses Maimonides (1135–1204) was forced to flee from Al-Andalus to avoid conversion by the Almohads. In Letter to Yemen, Maimonides wrote:

End of the Golden Age
With the death of Al-Hakam II in 976, the caliphate began to dissolve, and the position of the Jews became more precarious under the various smaller kingdoms. The first major persecution was the 1066 Granada massacre, which occurred on 30 December in which a Muslim mob stormed the royal palace in Granada, crucified the Jewish Vizier Joseph ibn Naghrela and massacred many of the Jewish population of the city. According to one source, "more than 1,500 Jewish families, numbering 4,000 persons, fell in one day". It was the first persecution of Jews on the Peninsula under Islamic rule.

Beginning in 1090, the situation deteriorated further with the invasion of the Almoravids, a puritan Muslim dynasty from Morocco. Even under the Almoravids, some Jews prospered although far more so under Ali III, than under his father, Yusuf ibn Tashfin. Among those who held the title of "vizier" or "nasi" in Almoravid times were the poet and physician Abu Ayyub Solomon ibn al-Mu'allam, Abraham ibn Meïr ibn Kamnial, Abu Isaac ibn Muhajar and Solomon ibn Farusal. The Almoravids were ousted from the peninsula in 1148, but the region was again invaded, this time by the even more puritanical Almohads.

During the reign of the Berber dynasties, many Jewish and even Muslim scholars left the Muslim-controlled portion of Iberia for the city of Toledo, which had been reconquered in 1085 by Christian forces.

The major Jewish presence in Iberia continued until the Jews were forced to leave or to convert to Christianity in the Alhambra Decree of 1492 and a similar decree by Portugal in 1496.

Notable figures
 Kaula al Yahudi, military commander appointed by Tariq ibn Ziyad during the Muslim conquest of Hispania
 Abu al-Fadl ibn Hasdai, philosopher, vizier at Taifa of Zaragoza
 Joseph ibn Hasdai, poet, father of Abu al-Fadl ibn Hasdai
 Yekutiel ben Isaac ibn Hassan, poet, talmudist and vizier at Taifa of Zaragoza, fell from favor, executed.
 Abu Ruiz ibn Dahri fought in the war against the Almohades.
 Ibrahim ibn Yaqub, traveller, probably a merchant. 
 Amram ben Isaac ibn Shalbib, scholar and diplomat in the service of Alfonso VI of Castile
 Bahya ibn Paquda, philosopher and author of Chovot HaLevavot
 Bishop Bodo-Eleazar; according to the Jewish Encyclopedia, "a convert to Judaism ... [who]... went to Córdoba, where he is said to have endeavored to win proselytes for Judaism from among the Spanish Christians."
 Dunash ben Labrat (920–990), poet
 Isaac Albalia, astronomer and rabbi at Granada
 Jehiel ben Asher, poet
 Joseph ibn Migash, diplomat for Granada
 Maimonides, rabbi, physician, and philosopher
 Menahem ben Saruq, philologist
 Nachmanides, also referred to by the acronym Ramban, scholar, rabbi, philosopher, physician, kabbalist, and biblical commentator.
 Solomon ibn Gabirol, poet and philosopher
 Moses ben Enoch, rabbi and Talmudic scholar
 Yehuda Halevi, poet and philosopher
 Samuel ha-Levi, treasurer of king Pedro I "the Cruel" of Castile
 Abraham ibn Ezra, rabbi and poet
 Moses ibn Ezra, philosopher and poet
 Benjamin of Tudela, traveler and explorer
 Samuel ibn Naghrillah, king's minister at Taifa of Granada and poet
 Joseph ibn Naghrillah, king's minister, son of Samuel ibn Naghrillah
 Hasdai ibn Shaprut, royal physician and statesman
 Judah ben Saul ibn Tibbon, translator and physician
 Joseph ibn Tzaddik, rabbi, poet and philosopher.
 Abraham ibn Daud, astronomer, historian, and philosopher. He is sometimes known by the abbreviation Rabad I or Ravad I.

See also

Al-Andalus
History of the Jews in Poland - Between , called Paradisus Judaeorum (Latin for "Paradise of the Jews")
History of the Jews in Portugal
History of the Jews in Spain
History of Portugal
History of Spain
Judeo-Islamic philosophies (800–1400)
La Convivencia
Reconquista
Sephardim under Islam
Spanish Inquisition and repression of the Jews
Timeline of Portuguese history
Timeline of the Muslim presence in the Iberian Peninsula

Notes

References
 Esperanza Alfonso, Islamic culture through Jewish eyes : al-Andalus from the tenth to twelfth century, 2007 
 Mark Cohen, Under Crescent and Cross: The Jews in the Middle Ages 1995 
 Joel Kraemer, "Comparing Crescent and Cross," The Journal of Religion, Vol. 77, No. 3. (Jul., 1997), pp. 449–454. (Book review)
 "The Myth of the Andalusian Paradise" by Darío Fernández-Morera – critique of view of Al-Andalus as tolerant society

External links
 Jewish Encyclopedia article on Spain
 Excerpt from Farewell Espana: The World of the Sephardim Remembered by Howard M. Sachar, at MyJewishLearning
 The Musical Legacy of Al-Andalus an interview between Banning Eyre (Afropop Worldwide) and Dwight Reynolds, Associate Professor in the Department of Religious Studies, Director of the Center for Middle East Studies, and Chair of Islamic and Near Eastern Studies at the University of California, Santa Barbara
 Medieval Hebrew Poetry
 The Sephardim

Jewish culture of al-Andalus
Jewish culture in Spain
Jewish Spanish history
Jewish political status
Jewish Portuguese history
Medieval Jewish history
Medieval Spain
Sephardi Jewish culture in Europe